Liometophilus is a genus of hidden snout weevils in the beetle family Curculionidae. There are at least two described species in Liometophilus.

Species
These two species belong to the genus Liometophilus:
 Liometophilus manni Fall, 1912
 Liometophilus manui Hustache, 1936

References

Further reading

 
 
 

Cryptorhynchinae
Articles created by Qbugbot